Ahmed Jibril (April 1937 – 7 July 2021) was a Palestinian militant, the founder and leader of the Popular Front for the Liberation of Palestine – General Command (PFLP-GC).

During the Syrian Civil War, Jibril was a notable supporter of the Assad government and PFLP-GC members helped government forces to fight the Syrian opposition. However, after clashes with rebels in Yarmouk Camp in Damascus, the PFLP-GC suffered defections and was forced to withdraw from the camp, and Jibril fled the city.

Early life
Jibril was born in Yazur a town near Jaffa in Mandatory Palestine, in April 1937, to a Palestinian father and Syrian mother.  Other sources indicate that he was born in 1935 in the city of Ramla. His family moved to Syria in 1948, where he was raised. He graduated from the Homs Military Academy and served in the Syrian army from 1956 until 1958, rising to the rank of captain before being expelled as a suspected Communist. In 1959 he founded the Palestinian Liberation Front. Beginning in 1965  he worked closely with the leadership of the Palestinian National Liberation Movement (Fatah), including Yasser Arafat. In 1967 he joined with George Habash to found the Popular Front for the Liberation of Palestine, an armed movement that combined Arab nationalism with leftist ideology, and which was in conflict with Arafat.

Break from the PFLP
In 1968 Jibril broke away from the PFLP because of disputes over the more revolutionary Marxism advocated by Habash and Nayef Hawatmeh.  He formed a new organization, the pro-Syrian "The Popular Front for the Liberation of Palestine - General Command" (PFLP-General Command).

Jibril never wavered from his belief that Palestine could only be liberated through military attrition. He joined George Habash and other splinter groups which opposed negotiations with the Israeli government. He launched a variety of inventive attacks, including the "Night of the Gliders" on 25 November 1987.

Leader of PFLP-GC
Samuel Katz's Israel vs. Jibril distinguishes the PFLP-GC and Jibril's strategy from the rest of the Palestine Liberation Organization (PLO) by its emphasis on military training and equipment, and not on declarations and publicity stunts. This caused the group to fail to make a significant mark on the public debate. Since 1994's Oslo Accords, support for the PFLP-GC dwindled among Palestinians.

On 7 May 2001, the Israeli Navy seized a Palestinian boat filled with heavy weapons in the port of Haifa. Jibril is believed to have been behind the shipment of weapons, which were bound for the Gaza Strip.

During the Syrian civil war, the PFLP-GC helped the Syrian Army to fight the Syrian rebels in and around Yarmouk Camp – a district of Damascus that is home to the biggest community of Palestinian refugees in Syria. Several members of the PFLP-GC's central committee opposed this alliance with the government and resigned in protest. By 17 December 2012, the rebels, which included Palestinians, had won control of Yarmouk. Jibril fled Damascus, reportedly for the Mediterranean city of Tartous. Palestinian left-wing groups—including the PFLP—berated Jibril and the PFLP-GC. One PFLP official said that Jibril "does not even belong to the Palestinian Left. He is closer to the extremist right-wing groups than to revolutionary leftist ones". On 18 December, the Palestinian National Council (PNC) denounced Jibril, saying it would expel him over his role in the conflict.

In a 17 February 2017 Al Mayadeen TV interview, the subject expressed his hope that the Iranian military with others would fully back the future Palestinian war against Israel.

Personal life
Jibril's son, Jihad Ahmed Jibril, who headed the PFLP-GC's military wing and was in line to replace Jibril as leader of the group, was killed by a car bomb in Beirut on 20 May 2002.

Jibril died of heart failure on July 7, 2021, in Damascus, Syria. After a funeral service in the Al-Othman Mosque in Damascus with his coffin draped in the Palestinian flag, he was buried in the Martyrs Cemetery of the Yarmouk Palestinian refugee camp.

See also

Jibril Agreement
Kiryat Shmona massacre

References

External links
Ahmed Jibril and the PFLP-GC
How Jibril betrayed the hiding place of Gadaffi

1937 births
2021 deaths
Palestinian Arab nationalists
Palestinian militants
Palestinian military personnel
Palestinians in Syria
People of the Syrian civil war
Palestinian Liberation Front members
Popular Front for the Liberation of Palestine members
Palestinian murderers
Arab people in Mandatory Palestine